Stéphane Antiga (born 3 February 1976) is French professional volleyball coach and former player. He was a member of the France national team from 1998 to 2010, and a participant in the Olympic Games Athens 2004. The current head coach of DevelopRes Rzeszów.

Personal life
Antiga was born in Suresnes, Hauts-de-Seine, France. He has a wife Stephanie. They have two children - a son Timote and a daughter Manoline.

Career as player

Clubs
In his career he has played for the teams of Paris UC (France), Paris Volley, Bre Banca Lannutti Cuneo, Portol Palma de Mallorca, Skra Bełchatów and Delecta Bydgoszcz. In April 2013, he signed a contract to return to PGE Skra Bełchatów. After winning gold medal of 2014 Polish Championship with club from Bełchatów he ended his career as a player.

National team
He is silver medalist of European Championship from Germany 2003 and Turkey 2009, bronze medalist of World Championship 2002. Antiga played 306 games with the French national team and was previously captain of the team.

Career as coach

On 24 October 2013 it was announced that Antiga had been appointed as the new head coach of the Poland men's national volleyball team in a three-year contract, replacing Andrea Anastasi.  His deputy will be Philippe Blain. Antiga was a player of PGE Skra Bełchatów until the end of the 2013/2014 season. On 21 September 2014 he won his first medal as a coach – Poland won a title of World Champion 2014. On 27 October 2014 he received a state award granted by the Polish President Bronisław Komorowski – Knight's Cross of the Order of Merit of the Republic of Poland for outstanding contribution to the development of Polish sport, for achievements in training. On 10 December 2014 Antiga and Blain were honored by the Ambassador of France in Poland medals Officers Ordre du Mérite sportif. Historic result at World Championship brought the team their next title of the Best Team of 2014 in 80th Plebiscyt Przeglądu Sportowego 2014 in Poland. Head coach Antiga was awarded a title of the Coach of the year 2014 ex-aequo with Łukasz Kruczek. In 2017 Antiga was named a new head coach of Canada men's national volleyball team In 2017 he also was named a new head coach of Polish club ONICO Warszawa.

Honours

As a player
 CEV Champions League
  2000/2001 – with Paris Volley

 FIVB Club World Championship
  Doha 2009 – with PGE Skra Bełchatów
  Doha 2010 – with PGE Skra Bełchatów

 CEV Cup
  1999/2000 – with Paris Volley
  2005/2006 – with Portol Palma de Mallorca

 CEV Challenge Cup
  2004/2005 – with Portol Palma de Mallorca

 National championships
 1995/1996  French Championship, with Paris UC
 1996/1997  French Cup, with Paris UC
 1996/1997  French Championship, with Paris UC
 1997/1998  French Championship, with Paris UC
 1998/1999  French Cup, with Paris Volley
 1999/2000  French Cup, with Paris Volley
 1999/2000  French Championship, with Paris Volley
 2000/2001  French Cup, with Paris Volley
 2000/2001  French Championship, with Paris Volley
 2001/2002  French Championship, with Paris Volley
 2002/2003  French Championship, with Paris Volley
 2004/2005  Spanish SuperCup, with Portol Palma de Mallorca
 2004/2005  Spanish Cup, with Portol Palma de Mallorca
 2005/2006  Spanish Cup, with Portol Palma de Mallorca
 2005/2006  Spanish Championship, with Portol Palma de Mallorca
 2006/2007  Spanish Championship, with Portol Palma de Mallorca
 2007/2008  Polish Championship, with PGE Skra Bełchatów
 2008/2009  Polish Cup, with PGE Skra Bełchatów
 2008/2009  Polish Championship, with PGE Skra Bełchatów
 2009/2010  Polish Championship, with PGE Skra Bełchatów
 2010/2011  Polish Cup, with PGE Skra Bełchatów 
 2010/2011  Polish Championship, with PGE Skra Bełchatów
 2013/2014  Polish Championship, with PGE Skra Bełchatów
 2021/2022  Polish SuperCup, with DevelopRes Rzeszów
 2021/2022  Polish Cup, with DevelopRes Rzeszów

As a coach
 National championships
 2018/2019  Polish Championship, with ONICO Warsaw

Individual awards
 2009: CEV European Championship – Best Receiver

State awards
 2014:  Knight's Cross of the Order of Merit of the Republic of Poland
 2014:  Médaille d’or de la jeunesse, des sports et de l’engagement associatif

References

External links

 
 
 Player profile at LegaVolley.it 
 Coach/Player profile at Volleybox.net
 
  

1976 births
Living people
Sportspeople from Suresnes
French men's volleyball players
French Champions of men's volleyball
Spanish Champions of men's volleyball
Polish Champions of men's volleyball
French volleyball coaches
Volleyball coaches of international teams
Olympic volleyball players of France
Volleyball players at the 2004 Summer Olympics
Knights of the Order of Merit of the Republic of Poland
French expatriate sportspeople in Italy
Expatriate volleyball players in Italy
French expatriate sportspeople in Spain
Expatriate volleyball players in Spain
French expatriate sportspeople in Poland
Expatriate volleyball players in Poland
Paris Volley players
Skra Bełchatów players
BKS Visła Bydgoszcz players
Projekt Warsaw coaches
Outside hitters